Hualin Temple is a Buddhist temple located in Gulou District, Fuzhou, Fujian, China. After the introduction of Chan Buddhism from China to Japan in the Song dynasty (960–1279), the architectural style of the Song dynasty had a profound influence on Japan's traditional cultural and folk customs.  The oldest things in the temple is the Main Hall, which was built in the early Song dynasty (960–1279).

History

Song dynasty
Hualin Temple was first built with the name of "Yueshan Jixiang Chan Temple" in 964 by the then provincial governor of Fuzhou Bao Xiurang, under the kingdom of Wuyue in the Five Dynasties and Ten Kingdoms (907–960).  During the reign of Emperor Gaozong (1127–1162), he inscribed the name on a plaque to the name.  In the Song and Ming dynasties, the temple is renowned for its quiet and beautiful environment, which attracted many literati to come and compose poems to eulogize the temple, including Li Gang, Zhang Jun, Wang Yingshan, and Xie Zhaozhi.

Ming dynasty
In 1444, in the ruling of Emperor Yingzong in the Ming dynasty (1368–1644), the emperor inscribed and honored the name "Hualin Temple", which is still in use now.

Qing dynasty
In 1644, the year of the founding of the Qing dynasty (1644–1911), Hualin Temple was renovated by monks. In 1668, in the ruling of Kangxi Emperor (1662–1722), it was refurbished again. The temple became dilapidated due to neglect in the Yongzheng era (1723–1735). It was enlarged in the Jiaqing (1796–1820) and Daoguang periods (1821–1850). Lin Zexu, a notable official in the Qing court, wrote an article about the reconstruction project.

People's Republic of China
After the establishment of the Communist State in 1953, Hualin Temple was designated as a provincial level cultural heritage by the Fujian Provincial Government.

In 1966, Mao Zedong launched the ten-year Cultural Revolution, the Shanmen, Hall of Four Heavenly Kings, corridors and walls were demolished by the Red Guards with only the Main Hall remaining.

On 23 February 1982, the Main Hall of Hualin Temple was listed among the second batch of "Major National Historical and Cultural Sites in Fujian" by the State Council of China. 

Hualin Temple was officially reopened to the public in the Chinese New Year of 1990.

Architecture

Main Hall
The Main Hall in the temple has single-eave gable and hip roof covered with black tiles, which represented water then and could extinguish fire. It still preserves the architectural style of the early Song dynasty. It is rectangular in shape with eight purlins and four pillars. It is the earliest wooden architecture in Jiangnan.

Gallery

References

Bibliography

External links
Hualin Monastery, Architectura Sinica Site Archive

History of Fujian
Buddhist temples in Fuzhou
Buildings and structures in Fuzhou
Tourist attractions in Fuzhou
10th-century establishments in China
10th-century Buddhist temples
Major National Historical and Cultural Sites in Fujian